Brockport is an unincorporated community in Horton Township, Elk County, Pennsylvania, United States. Its ZIP code is 15823.

Notes

Unincorporated communities in Elk County, Pennsylvania
Unincorporated communities in Pennsylvania